Richard Waller may refer to:
 Richard Waller (naturalist) (died 1715), English naturalist, translator and illustrator
 Sir Richard Waller (knight), English soldier and official
 Richard Waller (musician), American clarinetist and visual artist
 Rik Waller (Richard Waller), English pop singer